Marcus Dray Dimanche (born 20 May 1998), is an Australian-born Mauritian footballer who currently played as a midfielder for the Preston Lions of the National Premier Leagues Victoria 2 and the Mauritius national football team.

Club career
Dimanche started his career with the Bentleigh Greens, having spent time with the Football Federation Australia-ran National Training Centre. He joined Melbourne City in 2014, and spent time with their youth ranks, before leaving at the end of the 2016 season.

He joined fellow NPL Victoria 2 East side Richmond SC ahead of the 2017 season.

International career
At the youth level he played in the 2016 COSAFA U-20 Cup.

Dimanche made his senior international debut in a qualification game for the 2017 Africa Cup of Nations, replacing Michael Bosqui in the 87th minute of a 0–1 loss to Mozambique.

Career statistics

Club

Notes

International

References

External links
 

1998 births
Living people
Mauritian footballers
Mauritius international footballers
Mauritius under-20 international footballers
Association football defenders
Association football midfielders
Melbourne City FC players
Richmond SC players
Springvale White Eagles FC players
Oakleigh Cannons FC players
Preston Lions FC players
Australian people of Mauritian descent
Soccer players from Melbourne